George Townsend may refer to:
 George Townsend (politician) (1769–1844), U.S. Representative from New York
 George Fyler Townsend (1814–1900), translator of the standard English edition of Aesop's Fables
 George Townsend (cricketer) (1814–1870), English cricketer
 George Townsend (priest) (1788–1857), English clergyman and author
 George Townsend (baseball) (1867–1930), American baseball player
 George Alfred Townsend (1841–1914), war correspondent and novelist
 George Henry Townsend (1787–1869), English literary compiler and journalist
 George Townsend (footballer) (1957-), English footballer

See also 
 George Townshend (disambiguation)